Arthur Albert Chresby (6 February 1908 – 25 August 1985) was an Australian politician. Born in New South Wales, he attended state schools before becoming a journalist, then a car salesman, and finally a public relations consultant. In 1958, he was elected to the Australian House of Representatives as the Liberal member for the Queensland seat of Griffith, having previously contested the seat as a Services Party candidate. He was defeated in 1961. He had some association with the Australian League of Rights and its leader Eric Butler. He went on to write an information booklet 'Your Will Be Done' that was aimed at informing Australians of their electoral rights and obligations in an attempt to maintain the rights of everyday Australians. He maintained that the government and public representatives had as their sole purpose and duty is only to act upon the will of the Australian people, not political factions. He died in 1985.

References

Liberal Party of Australia members of the Parliament of Australia
Members of the Australian House of Representatives for Griffith
Members of the Australian House of Representatives
1908 births
1985 deaths
20th-century Australian politicians